Delhi–Meerut Expressway or National Expressway 3 is India's widest 96 km long controlled-access expressway, connecting Delhi with Meerut via Dasna in Ghaziabad in India. The 8 lanes old stretch of National Highway 9 (NH-9) up to Dasna is widened to 14 lanes(widest expressway in India). The fourth phase of the expressway is built on a new alignment from Dasna to Meerut – a six-lane stretch joining Meerut bypass. The  stretch between Nizamuddin Bridge and Dasna is one of the most congested areas in the NCR.The total project cost is estimated to be between ₹8,000–10,000 crores.

History
A proposal for a Ghaziabad to Meerut expressway was mentioned in the Lok Sabha by the then Minister of State for Urban Affairs and Employment in March 1999. The proposal again found mention in a February 2000 seminar speech by the then Union Urban Development Minister.

An expressway from Delhi to Meerut via Ghaziabad was then proposed under the NCR Transport Plan 2021, which was notified in September 2005. The Delhi to Ghaziabad section was to be taken up in 2001–11 with the Ghaziabad to Meerut scheduled 2011–21. In February 2006, the committee on infrastructure gave approval for a feasibility study for the expressway. The decision to build the expressway was announced in the 2006 budget speech by then Finance Minister P. Chidambaram. Construction of 1,000 km of expressways under National Highway Development Program (NHDP) Phase-VI was approved in November 2006. In December 2006, it was reported that 600 km of expressways would be chosen from among the proposed expressways including the Delhi-Meerut expressway for the first stage of NHDP Phase-VI on the basis of a prioritization study being taken up by the NHAI.

In April 2008, it was reported that proposals had been invited from consultants for deciding the alignment of the expressway. In November 2009, it was reported that the alignment study had been completed and a consultant had been appointed for the feasibility study for the project, with the expected completion of the study by May 2010. In August 2011, it was reported that the expressway was targeted for completion by December 2015. In October 2011, it was reported that the feasibility report was under progress and the project was to be taken up under NHDP Phase-VI. The alignment proposed was to be along NH-24 from Nizammuddin to Dasna and then to Meerut. In December 2011, the December 2015 targeted completion date was reaffirmed and the feasibility report submitted by the appointed consultant was said to be under study.

In May 2012, it was reported that the original target of awarding concession by 2009–10 was not completed due to various problems regarding alignment finalisation, and the consequent delay in feasibility reports. In July 2013, the Steering Group appointed by the Prime Minister to accelerate Infrastructure Investment decided on 15 March 2014 as the last date for awarding of contract for the expressway.

In August 2013, it was reported that the expressway was targeted for the contemporary financial year. In November 2013, it was reported that the stretch from Delhi up to UP Gate was to be converted from six lanes to fourteen lanes with six lanes grade-separated exclusively for traffic moving towards Meerut. The stretch from UP Gate to Dasna was to be eight laned and a new six lane alignment was to come up from Dasna to Meerut bypass on National Highway – 58.

On 18 November 2013, it was confirmed that Centre, not the Uttar Pradesh State Government, would build the much delayed Delhi–Meerut Expressway starting from Nizamuddin Bridge on Ring Road. Once complete, commuters will be able to reach Meerut in 45 to 60 minutes and cut travel time to Haridwar and Dehradun by almost an hour.

The Cabinet Committee on Economic Affairs (CCEA) under the government of India Chaired by Prime Minister Narendra Modi approved the Delhi–Meerut Expressway (4 laning)  with construction of connected roads to be undertaken in July 2014. CCEA under PM Modi again approved the widening of these roads 8/6 laning in May 2016.
There will be six- to eight-laning of NH 24 (Hapur bypass), six laning of NH 58 (Delhi-UP border), six-laning of NH 235 (Delhi-UP). The deadline set for the project is three years.

Construction of the Nizamuddin to Dasna road was scheduled to begin on 31 December 2015.

Project 
National Highway Authority of India (NHAI) divided the 96 km stretch starting from Nizamuddin bridge in the outer ring road in New Delhi to Meerut bypass into four packages:

Package I: Nizamuddin Bridge to Delhi-UP border 
This section is 8.7 km long, 14 Lane (6 Lane Expressway, 8 Lane Normal Highway, 2.5 m Bicycle Track on Both Side) with 4 flyovers and 3 vehicle underpass. The project involved development of expressway from Nizamuddin Bridge (km-0.000) to existing Delhi-Uttar Pradesh Border (km-8.360) section of  NH-24

Development of Package I of Delhi–Meerut Expressway in length of 8.7 km in Delhi was awarded to concessionaire Welspun Delhi Meerut Expressway Private Limited. Total project cost was estimated to be . This phase of the expressway was inaugurated on 27 May 2018 by Prime Minister Narendra Modi.

Package II: Delhi-UP Border to Dasna
This section is 19.2 km long, 14 lane (6 lane expressway, 8 lane normal highway, 2.5 m bicycle track on both sides) with 13 vehicle underpasses and 6 foot-underpasses.

A total nine underpasses and three flyovers are planned on the 20 km stretch to Dasna. But following a revision in the detailed project report, the plan was amended to 15 underpasses and a just one flyover, at Lal Kuan. The underpasses has been built in such a way that there is no crisscrossing traffic on the expressway and traffic flow at intersections will be altered accordingly. This section was completed on 1 April 2021 and opened for public.

Package III: Dasna to Hapur
This section is 22.2 km long, 8 lane normal highway, from existing km 27.500 to existing km 49.923 of NH 24. 1 flyover and 12 underpass will be constructed on this segment. Previously it was 6 lane but in Sep–Oct 2016 board meeting it was updated to 8 lanes.

This section was formally inaugurated on 30 September 2019 by Nitin Gadkari, Union Minister of MoRTH

Package IV: Dasna to Meerut 
46 km long, 6 lane expressway is a new greenfield alignment. The alignment stretched from Dasna in Ghaziabad district to Meerut Bypass at Partapur. Earlier, the 45-km-long Ghaziabad to Meerut section of NH-58 was also part of project but due to the decision of Rapid Rail Transit System (RRTS) to use dividers on NH-58 for trains' elevated corridor, the highway was not used and new alignment was proposed.

The tender for the above alignment was awarded to GR Infraprojects for a contract value of ₹1,087.07 crores. This section was completed on 1 April 2021 and opened for public.

Funding 
Of the total project cost, 40% was funded by the National Highways Authority of India (NHAI) under the new 'Hybrid Annuity Model'. The remaining 60% was arranged by the concessionaire by way of mix of debt/equity of 48:12, 12% being the promoter's contribution and rest will be funded by Punjab National Bank-led consortium.

Historical Timeline 
 Prime Minister Narendra Modi laid the foundation stone for the expressway on 30 December 2015.

Section 1: Nizamuddin Bridge to Delhi-UP Border 
 2017 Mar: 15% work completed.
 2017 Aug: 60% work completed.
 2017 Nov: 75% work completed.
 2018 Apr: 100% work completed
 27 May 2018: Inaugurated by the Prime Minister of India, Narendra Modi  .

Section 2: Delhi-UP Border to Dasna 
 2017 Mar: Contract is yet to be awarded to developer.
 2017 Aug: Apco-Chetak (joint venture between Apco Infra from Uttar Pradesh and Chetak from Rajasthan) the developer for this section is not able to complete financial closure for this section i.e. not able to get it financed by banks.
2017 Nov: Work has finally started on this section. Leveling work has started and separator boards have been enacted for proposed flyover at Lal Kuan by Apco Infra.
 2018 May: 15% work completed.
 2018 Oct: 24% work completed.
 2019 Jan: 35% work completed.
 2019 Feb: UP border to Dasna will be completed By December 2019 i.e. before the official deadline of May 2020.
 2019 Apr: 46% work completed on UP-Border – Vijaynagar stretch of 8 km.
 2019 July: 53% work completed on UP-Border – Vijaynagar stretch of 8 km. To be inaugurated by December 2019.
 2019 Aug: 53% work completed on UP-Border – portion from UP Gate to Pratap Vihar will be opened by October 2019. Full stretch to be inaugurated by December 2019, however, rail over-bridge at LalKuan will be completed by May 2020.
2020 Feb:70% work completed.
2020 Aug: 85% work completed. 
2021 Apr: Completed on 1 April 2021 and opened for public.

Section 3: Dasna to Hapur 
 2017 Mar: Work started.
 2017 Aug: 15% work completed.
 2018 May: 60% work completed.
 2019 Jan: 85% work completed.
 2019 July: 95% work completed. 5 km-long Pilkhuwa elevated road opened.
 2019 Aug 10: 97% work completed. Masuri bridge opened.
 2019 Aug 19: 97% work completed.
 2019 Sep 02: Dasna to Hapur section opened for traffic.
 2019 Sep 30, 2019: Section formally inaugurated by Nitin Gadkari, Union Minister of MoRTH

Section 4: Dasna to Meerut 
 2018 May: 3% work completed.
 2018 Dec: 25% work completed
 2019 July: 51% work completed
 2019 Sep: The stretch to get delayed as no work has started on 4 km of track due to land not handed over to authority because of on going land scam enquiry.
 2019 Dec: The Ghaziabad District Administration handed over 71 hectares of land to NHAI for construction of Meerut Expressway, clearing the land hurdle. 
 2020 Feb: 60% work completed.
 2020 Aug: 75% work completed.
2021 Apr: Completed on 1 April 2021 and opened for public.

Green initiatives
The National Highways Authority of India (NHAI) utilised the solid waste from Ghazipur landfill in construction of Delhi–Meerut Expressway to curb pollution.

See also
 Eastern Peripheral Expressway (KGP Expressway)
 Western Peripheral Expressway (KMP Expressway)
 National Highway 9 (Old NH-24)
 National Highway 34 (Old NH-58)
 Delhi–Meerut RRTS
 Delhi Noida Direct Flyway (DND Flyway)

References

National expressways in India
Transport in Meerut
Expressways in Uttar Pradesh
Expressways in Delhi